The works of Jože Plečnik in Ljubljana – Human Centred Urban Design is a UNESCO World Heritage Site in Ljubljana, Slovenia, listed in 2021. The site encompasses some of the most prominent works of  Slovenian architect Jože Plečnik in Ljubljana. During the interwar period, Plečnik worked to transform Ljubljana from a provincial city to the capital of the Slovenian nation by creating a series of public spaces and public institutions and integrating them into the pre-existing urban fabric. Sites include the St. Michael's Church in Črna Vas, and the following sites in Ljubljana: the promenade along the embankments of the Ljubljanica River and the bridges crossing it, the "Green promenade":  Vegova Street with the National and University Library from French Revolution Square to Congress Square and Star Park, Trnovo Bridge, Roman Walls in Mirje, the Church of St. Francis of Assisi, and the All Saints Garden in Žale Cemetery.

List of the sites

The World Heritage Site comprises seven of Plečnik's works or ensembles:

References 

World Heritage Sites in Slovenia
Jože Plečnik